Alexis Seliniotakis (born 10 July 1989) is a Greek professional footballer who plays as a defensive midfielder for Super League 2 club Episkopi.

Honours
Platanias
Chania FCA Cup: 2005–06

AO Chania
Chania FCA Cup: 2007–08, 2009–10
Delta Ethniki: 2009–10

Chania
Gamma Ethniki: 2014–15

References

1989 births
Living people
Greek footballers
Super League Greece 2 players
Football League (Greece) players
Gamma Ethniki players
AO Chania F.C. players
Platanias F.C. players
Episkopi F.C. players
Association football midfielders
Footballers from Chania